David Opdyke (born 1969) is an American visual artist who works in sculpture and installation. He was born in Schenectady, New York, and lives in Queens.

Reception
Opdyke's work has received critical attention in The Paris Review, the Detroit Art Review, Hyperallergic, The New York Times, among other publications.

Awards and honors
2004 - Aldrich Contemporary Art Museum Emerging Artist Award
2018 - New York Foundation for the Arts fellowship (in painting)

Collections
Opdyke's works are held in the permanent collections of the Museum of Modern Art, New York; the Brooklyn Museum, and other venues.

References

External links
 Official website
 This Land: A Conversation with David Opdyke, Lawrence Weschler, and Maya Wiley (video interview)

Sculptors from New York (state)
American male sculptors
1969 births
Living people